Jist'aña (Aymara for to close and for to carry bulky packages, also spelled Jisthana), also known as Pirámide Blanca (Spanish for "white piramid"), is a mountain in the Cordillera Real in the Bolivian Andes, about  high. It is situated in the La Paz Department, at the border of the Los Andes Province, Pucarani Municipality, and the Murillo Province, La Paz Municipality. Jist'aña lies between the mountain Kunturiri of the La Paz Municipality in the southeast and the peaks of Kunturiri of the Los Andes Province in the northwest. The rivers Kunturiri (Condoriri) and Jist'aña Jawira (Jistano Jahuira) originate near the mountain. Kunturiri River flows to Ch'iyar Quta, a lake southwest of Jist'aña, and Jist'aña Jawira which later is named Uma Pallqa (Uma Palca) flows to the northeast.

References 

Mountains of La Paz Department (Bolivia)